In a Rush is a 2012 French comedy-drama film written, directed by and starring Louis-Do de Lencquesaing. It was screened in the International Critics' Week section at the 2012 Cannes Film Festival.

Plot
Ada is in a relationship, with a child, about to get married, when she meets Paul, a single man with a daughter and an overbearing mother. His father dies.

Cast
Louis-Do de Lencquesaing as Paul Bastherlain
Marthe Keller as Mina
Valentina Cervi as Ada
Alice de Lencquesaing as Camille
Bernard Verley as BonP
Xavier Beauvois as François
Laurent Capelluto as Christian
Ralph Amoussou as Louis
Emola Romo-Renoir as Zoé
Denis Podalydès as The editor
André Marcon as The financial advisor
George Aguilar as The taxi driver

Critical response
Variety compared it to "a sad soap, only with literary ambitions and more nudity". The Hollywood Reporter suggested that first-time director Louis-Do de Lencquesaing should stick to being an actor: "one gets the impression here that his talent is best expressed on the other side of the lens."

References

External links 
 

2012 films
2012 comedy-drama films
French comedy-drama films
2010s French-language films
Films directed by Louis-Do de Lencquesaing
2012 directorial debut films
2010s French films